Spencer County is a county located in the U.S. state of Kentucky. As of the 2020 census, the total population was 19,490. Its county seat is Taylorsville. The county was founded in 1824 and named for Spier Spencer.

Spencer County is part of the Louisville/Jefferson County, KY—IN Metropolitan Statistical Area.

Taylorsville Lake, located primarily within Spencer County, serves as a major economic resource for the area. Spencer was a dry county until 2009 when the county's residents voted to overturn the ban on alcohol sales. From 2000 to 2005, Spencer County ranked 19th out of all U.S. counties in percent growth, with a 33% increase.

History
Spencer County was formed in January 1824, by the 32nd Kentucky General Assembly. The land that now makes up Spencer County was taken from Bullitt County, Shelby County, and Nelson County.  Spencer County became Kentucky's 77th county. The county was named for Kentucky's Captain Spier Spencer, who fought and died in the Battle of Tippecanoe.

Later that year, in December 1824, Taylorsville was made the county seat. In 1829, the city was incorporated.

During the American Civil War, the courthouse at Taylorsville was burned by Confederate guerrillas in January 1865, but the county's records were saved.

Geography

Adjacent counties
Shelby County  (north)
Anderson County  (east)
Nelson County  (south)
Bullitt County  (west)
Jefferson County  (northwest)

Major highways
Kentucky Route 44
Kentucky Route 55

Demographics

As of the census of 2000, there were 11,766 people, 4,251 households, and 3,358 families residing in the county. The racial makeup of the county was 97.50% White, 1.13% Black or African American, 0.22% Native American, 0.08% Asian, 0.27% from other races, and 0.79% from two or more races.  1.12% of the population were Hispanic or Latino of any race.

There were 4,251 households, out of which 38.40% had children under the age of 18 living with them, 67.90% were married couples living together, 7.60% had a female householder with no husband present, and 21.00% were non-families. 17.10% of all households were made up of individuals, and 6.00% had someone living alone who was 65 years of age or older.  The average household size was 2.74 and the average family size was 3.08.

In the county, the population was spread out, with 27.00% under the age of 18, 7.70% from 18 to 24, 33.50% from 25 to 44, 22.70% from 45 to 64, and 9.10% who were 65 years of age or older.  The median age was 35 years. For every 100 females, there were 101.80 males.  For every 100 females age 18 and over, there were 99.50 males.

The median income for a household in the county was $47,042, and the median income for a family was $52,038. Males had a median income of $36,638 versus $24,196 for females. The per capita income for the county was $19,848.  About 7.70% of families and 8.80% of the population were below the poverty line, including 8.90% of those under age 18 and 10.50% of those age 65 or over.

Education
The Spencer County Public Schools comprises six schools: Spencer County High School, Spencer County Middle School, Spencer County Elementary School, Taylorsville Elementary School, Hillview Academy, and Spencer County Preschool.

Communities

City
Taylorsville (county seat)

Census-designated place
Elk Creek

Other unincorporated places
Little Mount
Mount Eden
Rivals
Waterford
Yoder

Politics

See also

Louisville/Jefferson County–Elizabethtown–Bardstown, KY-IN Combined Statistical Area
National Register of Historic Places listings in Spencer County, Kentucky

References

External links
Spencer County official website
Spencer County Public Schools

 
Kentucky counties
Louisville metropolitan area
1824 establishments in Kentucky
Populated places established in 1824